The Hullaballoos were one of the original British Invasion bands. They are best known for their 1965 cover of Buddy Holly's "I'm Gonna Love You Too".

Biography
The Hullaballoos were created in August 1964, but had been working in the UK for over three years under the name of Ricky Knight and The Crusaders. They were not named after the American television programme Hullabaloo. Their name came from the city of Hull, England, whence they hailed. The band consisted of Geoffrey Mortimer (bass guitar and harmonies, born 1945), Harry Dunn (drums and harmonies, born December 1947, Kingston upon Hull), Ricky Knight (lead singer and rhythm guitar, born Ronald Mitchell, 1944) and Andy Woonton (lead guitar and harmonies, born Andrew Charles Wooton, 19 July 1943, London). They all sang harmony vocals.

The group's look (featuring long dyed blonde hair) and music was put together by Luigi Creatore and Hugo Peretti of Roulette Records to take advantage of the popularity in the United States of British Invasion bands. Signed to Roulette in the US, their UK records appeared on the Columbia label. They made numerous television appearances, most notably the Hullabaloo show. They recorded two albums: England's Newest Singing Sensations and On Hullabaloo (both 1965). Both albums are now available on a single CD.

Their music was reminiscent of Buddy Holly. The group split up soon after they started. Knight left first and was replaced for a short time by Mick Wayne (born Michael Wayne, 1945, Kingston upon Hull — died 24 June 1994) but the group broke up for good in 1966. In May 2010, original members Knight, Dunn, and Woonton re-united for one-off concert. Mortimer was unable to attend.

On 17 December 2016, Geoffrey Mortimer died from cancer, at the age of 71. On 27 August 2017, Harry Dunn died from an undisclosed illness.

Chart singles
"Did You Ever" (1965) - US Billboard Hot 100 No. 74
"I'm Gonna Love You Too" - US Hot 100 No. 56

References

External links
[ The Hullaballoos at Allmusic.com]
Official website

English rock music groups
English pop music groups
Musical groups established in 1965
Musical groups disestablished in 1966
Beat groups
Musical groups from Kingston upon Hull
British Invasion artists